Abu'l-Hasan (or Abu al-Hasan) (1589 – c. 1630), from Delhi, India, was a Mughal painter of miniatures during the reign of Jahangir.

Biography 
Abu al-Hasan was the son of Aqa Reza of Herat in Safavid Iran, a city with an artistic tradition. Aqa Reza was established as an artist and took up employment with Jahangir (r. 1605 –1627) before the latter's accession to the throne of the Mughal empire. When Abu al-Hasan began producing art, the emperor, Jahangir, appreciated the skills of the boy.  In 1599, Abu al-Hasan moved with Jahangir to his newly founded court in Allahabad.

The emperor considered Abu al-Hasan to be particularly special to him and under his care. This is because although Abu al-Hasan's artwork was similar in many ways to his father's with Dutch and English influence, it was considered to be of a higher quality similar to that of older masters in the field.  Jahangir said of Abu al-Hasan that he had no equal and for the work done on the frontispiece for his memoires, the emperor bestowed the title Nadir-uz-Saman ("Wonder of the Age") on Abu al-Hasan in 1618.

Abu al-Hasan's main task was the documentation of events at the imperial court, which resulted in many portraits being completed. Portraits were the hallmark of Jahangir's rule. Not many of Abu al-Hasan's paintings survived, but those that identify him as the artist show that he also worked on a range of subjects, including some everyday scenes and political paintings that showed the emperor and Mughal empire in a positive and powerful light. In addition to original works of art, Abu al-Hasan also retouched other artists' paintings (one such example is below: Dancing Dervishes)

Abu al-Hasan's career aligned with developments in the style of Mughal paintings. However, when Jahangir's reign came to an end, and Shah Jahan began his rule, Abu al-Hasan's career became less active until 1628 from which point on, there is no evidence of him producing art.

Works

Gallery

References

External links
The Emperors' album: images of Mughal India, an exhibition catalog from The Metropolitan Museum of Art (fully available online as PDF), which contains material on Abu al-Hasan
Study of Saint John the Evangelist, After Albrecht Durer, dated 1600 –1601, The Metropolitan Museum of Art
Spotted Forktail, Folio from the Shah Jahan Album (c. 1610 –1615) The Metropolitan Museum of Art 
Jahangir Shoots Malik 'Anbar (c.1620) Freer Gallery of Art 
Emperor Jahangir Triumphing over Poverty (c. 1620 –1625) Los Angeles County Museum of Art 
Darbar Scene of Jahangir  (c. 1615) Freer Gallery of Art 
Allegorical Representation of Emperor Jahangir and Shah 'Abbas of Persia ( c. 1618) Freer Gallery of Art 
The Mughal Emperor Jahangir with Radiant Gold Halo, Holding a Globe (c. 1617) Sotheby's Picture Library, London 
Jahangir entertains Abbas (c. 1620) Freer Gallery of Art 
An exhibition held at the Metropolitan Museum, October 21,1987-February 14,1988 

Mughal painters
1589 births
17th-century deaths
17th-century Iranian painters
17th-century Indian painters
Painters from Delhi